Amica is an Australian pop group targeting 6 to 12-year-olds. Their album Life is Fun was nominated for the ARIA Award for Best Children's Album in 2004.

Originally a four piece of Merrity 'Mez' Murphy, Natalie 'Nat' Strother, Daniella 'Dan' Taliangis and Kristina 'Kris' Visocchi (née Karhunen), they released their first single "Life Is Fun" in 2003. It debuted at #90 on the ARIA single charts. Mez departed in mid 2003 and the band continued as a three piece. They released a second single, "Rock Star" later that year and it debuted at #80. They released their album Life is Fun in April 2004. By mid 2004 Brandie had replaced Dan and the band broke up in July 2004.

Band members
Brandie
Merrity 'Mez' Murphy
Natalie 'Nat' Strother
Daniella 'Dan' Taliangis
Kristina 'Kris' Visocchi

Discography

Album

Singles

Awards and nominations

ARIA Music Awards

References

Australian children's musical groups
Australian girl groups
Australian pop music groups
Musical groups established in 2002
Musical groups disestablished in 2004